The  is a railway line operated by the East Japan Railway Company (JR East). It links Katori Station with Kashima Soccer Stadium Station by crossing and then following the Tone River, at the border between Chiba Prefecture and Ibaraki Prefecture.

Operation
Katori Station is on the Narita Line, and all trains of the Kashima Line run through from/to its neighboring station, Sawara, or beyond it, but all trains terminate at Kashima-Jingū. Only Kashima Rinkai Railway Ōarai Kashima Line trains run from here to Kashima Soccer Stadium and Mito Station. Kashima Soccer Stadium Station is only temporarily operated when football matches are held at Kashima Soccer Stadium, the home stadium of Kashima Antlers in J.League (Japan Professional Football League).

From Kashima Jingu to Sawara, JR East local trains run approximately once per 1–2 hours. Some Narita Line through service train runs beyond Sawara to Narita. Each day, one through service Sōbu Line (Rapid) train runs to Tokyo Station (weekdays) or Ōfuna Station (weekends and holidays) in the morning, and from Kurihama Station (weekdays) or Tokyo Station (weekends and holidays) in the evening.

Until 2015, the Limited Express Ayame service ran between Tokyo Station and Kashima Jingu once in a day, from Kashima Jingu in every morning, from Tokyo in every night, and stopped all stations on the Kashima Line. From Kashima-Jingū and Mito, Oarai Kashima Line local or rapid diesel trains run approximately once an hour. Normally, no passenger train stops at Kashima Soccer Stadium, except when football matches are played in the stadium.

JR Freight operates trains on the line, from Tokyo area to the Kashima Rinko Line. The trains change its directions at Kashima Soccer Stadium Station.

Stations

History
This line was planned as the main mass transportation method within the Kashima Industrial Zone along the southern coast of Ibaraki Prefecture, to connect with the Tokyo Metropolis.

20 August 1970 – Newly operated between Katori and Kashima-Jingū (14.2 km), as JNR Kashima Line.
12 November 1970 – Newly operated between Kashima-Jingū and Kita-Kashima (3.2 km), as the freight line.
24 October 1974 – The line was electrified.
March 1978 – Jet airplane fuel transport service was started from Kashima Rinkai Kashima Rinko Line (owned by Kashima Rinkai Railway), via Kita-Kashima Station, to Tsuchiya Freight Terminal Station, near Narita Station, to supply New Tokyo International Airport.
25 July 1978, Passenger service was begun between Kashima-Jingū and Kita-Kashima, as the beginning of passenger service in Kashima Rinko Line.
8 August 1983 – Jet fuel freight line ended (pipelines came on service).
1 December 1983 – The passenger service between Kashima-Jingū and Kita-Kashima was abolished, which was started in 1978.
14 March 1985 – The passenger service was re-opened in the section between Kashima- Jingu and Kita-Kashima, as the opening of Kashima Rinkai Oarai Kashima Line.
1 April 1987 – JR East succeeded this line from JNR.
12 March 1994 – Kita-Kashima Station was renamed to Kashima-Soccer-Stadium Station, and it served as a temporary station for football spectators in Kashima Stadium.
2 June 2002 – 2002 FIFA World Cup game, Argentina – Nigeria was played in Kashima Stadium. JR East operated special trains between Chiba Station to Kashima-Soccer-Stadium Station, as special rapid trains.

Rolling stock
E131 series 2-car EMUs (since 13 March 2021)

Sōbu Line (Rapid) through service
E217 series 4-car EMUs
E235-1000 series 4-car EMUs

Past
113 series EMUs
183 series EMUs (Ayame limited express services)
209-2000/2100 series 4-car EMUs (until 12 March 2021)
E257-500 series (Ayame limited express services until 13 March 2015)

References

External links

 
Lines of East Japan Railway Company
Railway lines in Chiba Prefecture
Rail transport in Ibaraki Prefecture
1067 mm gauge railways in Japan
Railway lines opened in 1970